The 1980 Avon Championships of Detroit  was a women's tennis tournament played on indoor carpet courts at the Cobo Hall & Arena  in Detroit, Michigan in the United States that was part of the 1980 Avon Championships circuit. It was the ninth edition of the tournament and was held from February 18 through February 24, 1980. Second-seeded Billie Jean King won the singles title and earned $35,000 first-prize money.

Finals

Singles
 Billie Jean King defeated  Evonne Goolagong Cawley 6–3, 6–0
 It was King's first title of the year and the 124th of her career.

Doubles
 Billie Jean King /  Ilana Kloss defeated  Kathy Jordan /  Anne Smith 3–6, 6–3, 6–2

Prize money

References

External links
 International Tennis Federation (ITF) tournament edition details

Avon Championships of Detroit
Virginia Slims of Detroit
1980 in sports in Michigan
February 1980 sports events in the United States